"Heavy" is a song recorded by English singer Anne-Marie. It was released on 22 September 2017 as the third single from her debut studio album, Speak Your Mind (2018). A lyric video was released the same day.

Composition
"Heavy" is a pop song that was compared to her previous single, "Ciao Adios". The song contains tropical-influenced beats that are found in much of the singer's recent work. The song was produced by The Invisible Men, Nana Rogues, Jonathan White, Team Salut, and MNEK.

Critical reception
Steph Evans of Earmilk wrote that the song "follows the punchy pop of "Ciao Adios," with this single giving more life to Anne-Marie's vocal power."

Track listing
Taken from iTunes.

Personnel
Adapted from Tidal.
 Anne-Marie Nicholson – lead vocals, songwriting
 The Invisible Men – songwriting, production, keyboard, programmer
 Tash Phillips – songwriting
 Iain James – songwriting
 MNEK – production, engineering, programmer
 Jonathan White – production, guitar, bass guitar, programmer
 Team Salut – production, guitar
 Nana Rogues – production, bass guitar, programmer
 Cameron Gower Poole – backing vocals, production, engineering
 Stuart Hawkes – mastering engineer
 Dylan Cooper – programmer
 Phil Tan – mixer

Charts

Certifications

Release history

References

2017 singles
British pop songs
2017 songs
Songs written by George Astasio
Songs written by Iain James
Songs written by Jason Pebworth
Songs written by Jon Shave
Song recordings produced by the Invisible Men
Asylum Records singles
Anne-Marie (singer) songs
Songs written by Anne-Marie (singer)